The 2018–19 New Mexico Lobos men's basketball team represented the University of New Mexico during the 2018–19 NCAA Division I men's basketball season. The Lobos were led by second-year head coach Paul Weir. They played their home games at Dreamstyle Arena, more commonly known as The Pit, in Albuquerque, New Mexico as members of the Mountain West Conference. They finished the season 14–18, 7–11 in Mountain West play to finish in a three-way tie for seventh place. They defeated Wyoming in the first round of the Mountain West tournament before losing in the quarterfinals to Utah State.

Previous season
The Lobos finished the season 19–15, 12–6 in Mountain West play to finish in third place. They defeated Wyoming and Utah State to advance to the championship game of the Mountain West tournament where they lost to San Diego State.

Offseason

Departures

Incoming transfers

2018 recruiting class

Roster

Schedule and results

|-
!colspan=9 style=| Exhibition

|-
!colspan=9 style=| Non-conference regular season

|-
!colspan=9 style=| Mountain West regular season

|-
!colspan=9 style=| Mountain West tournament

References

New Mexico Lobos men's basketball seasons
New Mexico
New Mexico Lobos men's basketball
New Mexico Lobos men's basketball